Károly Csapó (born 23 February 1952 in Agyagosszergeny) is a Hungarian former football player who participated in the 1978 and 1982 World Cup where Hungary was eliminated in the first round.

References 
 
 
  England Football
  Fussball
Magyar version of Wikipedia

1952 births
Living people
Hungarian footballers
Association football midfielders
Hungary international footballers
1978 FIFA World Cup players
1982 FIFA World Cup players
FC Tatabánya players
Hungarian expatriate footballers
Expatriate footballers in France
Toulouse FC players
Hungarian expatriate sportspeople in France
Grenoble Foot 38 players
Ligue 1 players
Hungarian football managers
FC Tatabánya managers
Sportspeople from Győr-Moson-Sopron County